Morris is an unincorporated community in Adams Township, Ripley County, in the U.S. state of Indiana.

History
Morris was originally called Springdale, and under the latter name was first settled about 1840 by a colony of German Catholics. The name was changed to Morris in 1856. A post office called Morris has been in operation since 1858. The center of community life is St. Anthony of Padua Catholic Church which was founded in 1856. The church also built a grade school in 1861 where many of the residents of the community attended until the school closed down in 1977.

References

Unincorporated communities in Ripley County, Indiana
Unincorporated communities in Indiana